Samuel Maxwell (May 20, 1825 – February 11, 1901)  was a Populist politician in the U.S. state of Nebraska.

Born in Lodi, New York, on  May 20, 1825, he moved with his parents to Michigan in 1844. He taught school, farmed, and studied law. He moved to the Nebraska Territory settling in Cass County, Nebraska, resumed farming. He returned to Michigan to complete his law studies and passed the bar in 1859. He returned to Nebraska the same year and set up practice in Plattsmouth, Nebraska.
 
He became interested in Nebraskan Territorial politics. He was a delegate to the first Republican Territorial convention. He was a  representative to the 1859, 1860, 1864, and 1865 Territorial house of representatives. He was a delegate to the Territorial constitutional conventions in 1864 and 1866 when Nebraska wrote its state's constitution. He was a member to the first Nebraska house of representatives in 1866. In 1867,  David Butler appointed Maxwell to the  board of commissioners to select capitol building plans and university lands. He was elected as an associate justice of the State supreme court in 1872, a job he was reelected to in 1875, 1881 and 1887. From 1878-82, again from 1886–88 and again from 1892 to 1894, he was the chief justice of the court. He was a delegate to the State constitutional convention in 1875. He was elected as a Populist to the Fifty-fifth Congress (March 4, 1897 – March 3, 1899). He resumed his law practice in Fremont, Nebraska, where he died on February 11, 1901. He is buried in Pleasant Hill Cemetery, Plattsmouth.

References

External links
  at the Nebraska State Historical Society

1825 births
1901 deaths
People from Lodi, New York
Chief Justices of the Nebraska Supreme Court
People's Party members of the United States House of Representatives from Nebraska
Members of the Nebraska Territorial Legislature
Republican Party members of the Nebraska House of Representatives
Nebraska lawyers
Nebraska Populists
People from Fremont, Nebraska
19th-century American politicians
People from Plattsmouth, Nebraska
19th-century American judges
Republican Party members of the United States House of Representatives from Nebraska